Tropidoturris simplicicingula is a species of sea snail, a marine gastropod mollusk in the family Borsoniidae.

There is one subspecies: Tropidoturris simplicicingula pondo Kilburn, 1986

Description
The size of the biconic shell attains 19.8 mm. Characteristic for this species is the fact that the shell has no axial ribs. The narrower spiral lirae are declivous. The shoulder cord is stronger to carinate.

Distribution
This marine species occurs off Agulhas Bank, South Africa

References

 Barnard, K. H. 1958. Contributions to the knowledge of South African marine Mollusca. Part 1. Gastropoda: Prosobranchiata: Toxoglossa. Ann. S. Afr. Mus. 44: 73–163.
 Steyn, D.G. & Lussi, M. (1998) Marine Shells of South Africa. An Illustrated Collector’s Guide to Beached Shells. Ekogilde Publishers, Hartebeespoort, South Africa, ii + 264 pp. page(s): 156

External links
 

Endemic fauna of South Africa
simplicicingula
Gastropods described in 1958